Archbishop O'Leary Catholic High School is a high school located in northeast Edmonton just north of the downtown core. They offer Advanced Placement courses and are known for their diverse teaching ways. The high school enrollment is fairly large with a student body of about 2,000 students.

History
Archbishop O'Leary opened in 1960 when Edmonton had a population of nearly 270,000. 
The school underwent a major, multi-million-dollar modernization renovation beginning in 2014, with full completion by late 2019. The modernization of the school included significant enhancements to classrooms and facilities, along with the addition of “The Hub” - which was transformed from a courtyard into a large cafeteria and student gathering space.  The school is known for its outstanding programming, a positive sense of community and has one of the best high school completion rates out of any high school and was recognized by Alberta Education for its accomplishments in this area.

Athletics

The O'Leary Spartans compete under the governance of the Alberta Schools Athletic Association and Edmonton Metro Athletic Association 

The school boasts teams in the following sports: 

Badminton, 
Basketball,
Cross Country,
Football,
Rugby 15's (Men and Women),
Rugby 7's (Men),
Soccer,
Swimming,
Track and Field,
Volleyball,
Wrestling,

O'Leary is known for the inclusive environment and the diverse programs that it excels at.  The Student Union (SU) is very active and the HUB boasts an amazing sound system and high definition screen that is used to host numerous events for students, often at lunch.  Clubs include:  Art, Spectrum (GSA), Model UN and others.

Programs 
Advanced Placement (AP)

Computer Science

Mechanics

Construction

Sports Medicine

Dance

Drama and Drama Production Academy

Soccer Academy

Finance

Legal Studies

The Braided Journeys Program that supports First Nations, Metis and Inuit students, families and the community is well-established and very positive.

Notable Alumni 
 Rick Walters (Canadian football) - Canadian professional football player
 Emilio Fraietta - Canadian professional football player
 Matt Frattin - professional hockey player
 Grace Mahary - fashion model
 Ross Ongaro - professional soccer player and coach; FIFA instructor
 Barry Peterson - Cinematographer
 Fernando Pisani - professional hockey player
 Joe Poplawski - Canadian professional football player
 Chris Benoit - Former Wrestler Entertainer

See also
Edmonton Catholic School District
Schools in Alberta

References

External links
 Archbishop O'Leary School site

High schools in Edmonton
Catholic secondary schools in Alberta
Educational institutions established in 1963
1963 establishments in Alberta